Millen may refer to:

Geography 
 Millen, Georgia, a city
 Millen Township, Michigan
 Millen, West Virginia, an unincorporated community
 Millen (Belgium), a village in the municipality of Riemst
 Millen (Germany), a village in the municipality of Selfkant
 Millen Range, a mountain range in Antarctica

People 
 Millen (surname)
 Millen Brand (1906–1980), American writer and poet
 Millen Matende (born 1982), Zimbabwean long-distance runner

Other uses
 Millen House, a historic house on the campus of Indiana University in Bloomington, Indiana, United States
 Millen High School, Millen, Georgia